The Workers' Party (DP) was a political party in Latvia.

History
The party was established in 1920 and won six seats in the Constitutional Assembly elections that year, becoming the joint fourth-largest party in the Assembly. For the 1922 elections it formed the Democratic Centre alliance with the Latvian People's Party, winning six seats. The two parties officially merged into the Democratic Centre the following year.

The party was re-established in 1997, and contested the 1998 elections in an alliance with the Christian Democratic Union and the Green Party, but failed to win a seat. In the 2002 elections it was part of the Centre Alliance, but again failed to win a seat. It ceased to exist in 2008.

References

Defunct political parties in Latvia
Political parties established in 1920
Political parties disestablished in 1923
Political parties established in 1997
Political parties disestablished in 2008
1920 establishments in Latvia
1997 establishments in Latvia
2008 disestablishments in Latvia